Westlock Airport  is located  east of Westlock, Alberta, Canada.

References

External links

Westlock Flying Club
Place to Fly on COPA's Places to Fly airport directory

Registered aerodromes in Alberta
Westlock County